Rob Morgan (born 
February 24, 1973) is an American actor known for his role as Turk Barrett in all six of Marvel's Netflix television series (2015-2018), Hap Jackson in Mudbound (2017), Officer Powell in Stranger Things (2016–present), and Teddy Oglethorpe in Don't Look Up (2021).

In 2020, he was ranked #20 on the New York Times list "The 25 Greatest Actors of the 21st Century".

Filmography

Television

Film

References

External links

Living people
American male film actors
American male television actors
21st-century American male actors
Place of birth missing (living people)
African-American male actors
1973 births